Discotrema is a genus of clingfishes found on reefs in the Indo-Pacific where they live on crinoids. These tiny fish have distinctive pattern consisting of long white or yellow lines along their body.

Species
There are currently three recognized species in this genus:
 Discotrema crinophilum Briggs, 1976 (Crinoid clingfish)
 Discotrema monogrammum Craig & J. E. Randall, 2008 (Oneline clingfish)
 Discotrema zonatum Craig & J. E. Randall, 2008

References

Gobiesocidae